is a railway station on the Shinano Railway Line in the city of Tōmi, Nagano, Japan, operated by the third-sector railway operating company Shinano Railway.

Lines
Shigeno Station is served by the 65.1 km Shinano Railway Line and is 27.9 kilometers from the starting point of the line at Karuizawa Station.

Station layout
The station consists of one ground-level island platform serving two tracks. The station is staffed.

Platforms

Adjacent stations

History
The station opened on 1 October 1923.

Passenger statistics
In fiscal 2011, the station was used by an average of 769 passengers daily.

Surrounding area
Shigeno Post Office
Chikuma River

See also
 List of railway stations in Japan

References

External links

  

Railway stations in Nagano Prefecture
Railway stations in Japan opened in 1923
Shinano Railway Line
Tōmi, Nagano